The Men's Greco-Roman 55 kg is a competition featured at the 2019 European Wrestling Championships, and was held in Bucharest, Romania on April 12 and April 13.

Medalists

Results 
 Legend
 F — Won by fall

Main Bracket

Repechage

References

Men's greco-roman 55 kg